The satellites of Mars include :

Non functional but (probably) orbiting:

Viking 1 & 2 orbiter
Mariner 9
Mars Global Surveyor
Mars 2, 3, 5
Phobos 2
Tianwen 1 Deployable Camera 2, CNSA, 2021
Functional and communicating:

Mars Odyssey (ODY), NASA, 2001
Mars Express (MEX), ESA, 2003
Mars Reconnaissance Orbiter (MRO), NASA, 2006
MAVEN (MVN), NASA, 2013
Mangalyaan (MOM), India, 2013
ExoMars Trace Gas Orbiter (TGO), ESA/Roscosmos, 2016
Emirates Mars Mission (Hope), UAESA, 2021
Tianwen 1 orbiter, CNSA, 2021

See also

 Exploration of Mars - has all the missions including landers
 List of missions to Mars - includes future missions

References